Fedora is an opera in three acts by Umberto Giordano to an Italian libretto by Arturo Colautti, based on the 1882 play Fédora by Victorien Sardou.  Along with Andrea Chénier and Siberia, it is one of the most notable works of Giordano.

It was first performed at the Teatro Lirico in Milan on 17 November 1898 conducted by the composer; Gemma Bellincioni created the role of Fedora with Enrico Caruso as her lover, Loris Ipanov.

Composition history
In 1889, Umberto Giordano saw Sardou's play Fédora at the Teatro Bellini di Napoli, with Sarah Bernhardt (for whom the play was written) in the title role. The play was popular, and the hat "fedora" was named after it. He immediately asked Sardou for permission to base an opera on the play, and Sardou initially refused because, at the time, Giordano was a relatively unknown composer. Following the premiere of his 1894 Regina Diaz, Giordano's publisher, Edoardo Sonzogno, asked Sardou again.  However, Sardou demanded what Sozogno considered an exorbitant fee. It was only on the third attempt, and after Giordano's success with Andrea Chénier in 1896, that an agreement was reached to go ahead with the opera.

Performance history
Its first performance took place in Milan at the Teatro Lirico Internazionale. Gemma Bellincioni sang the role of Fedora, and Enrico Caruso was Loris Ipanov. The opera had great success on its opening night, and was soon brought to the Vienna Staatsoper by Mahler, and then to Paris where it was reportedly admired by Massenet and Saint-Saëns.

Fedora received its US premiere on 5 December 1906 at the New York Metropolitan Opera, with Caruso as Count Loris, Lina Cavalieri as Fedora, and Arturo Vigna conducting. The opera received eight performances during the Met's 1906/1907 and 1907/1908 seasons, and was revived in the 1920s when it received 25 more performances between 1923 and 1926. The opera maintained its popularity, especially in Italy during the 50s, 60s and 70s, serving as a vehicle for celebrated sopranos and tenors such as Maria Caniglia, Maria Callas, Renata Tebaldi, Magda Olivero, Antonietta Stella, Marcella Pobbe, Giuseppe di Stefano, Mario del Monaco.

The 1990s saw a resurgence of interest in Fedora, with new productions at the Vienna Staatsoper, La Scala, New York's Metropolitan Opera, Chicago Lyric Opera, the Royal Opera House, Covent Garden, the Washington National Opera and the Teatro Colón in Buenos Aires. Notable singers in post-1990 productions include Mirella Freni, Renata Scotto, Agnes Baltsa, Katia Ricciarelli, and Maria Guleghina as Fedora; and Plácido Domingo, José Carreras, and José Cura as Loris. Among Fedora's more recent performances are those at the Vienna Staatsoper in 2003, La Scala in 2004, London's Holland Park Opera in 2006, and at the Metropolitan Opera in 2022/2023.

Roles

Synopsis

Act 1
St. Petersburg, 1881. A winter's night in the palace of Count Vladimir Andrejevich

Princess Fedora, who is to marry Count Vladimir Andrejevich the following day, arrives and sings of her love for him ("Quanti fior ... Ed ecco il suo ritratto"), unaware that the dissolute Vladimir has betrayed her with another woman. The sound of sleigh-bells is heard and Vladimir is brought in, mortally wounded. Doctors and a priest are summoned, and the servants are questioned (Dimitri: "Signore, alle otto e mezzo"; Cirillo: "Egli mi disse"). Fedora swears on the jeweled Byzantine cross she is wearing (aria: "Dite coragio ... Su questa santa Croce") that Andrejevich's death will be avenged. It is proposed that Count Loris Ipanov, a suspected Nihilist sympathizer, was probably the assassin. De Siriex (a diplomat) and Gretch (a police inspector) plan an investigation.

Act 2
Paris

Fedora has followed Ipanov to Paris to avenge Vladimir's death. There is a reception at Fedora's house, where the Countess Olga Sukarev introduces the virtuoso Polish pianist Boleslao Lazinski. De Siriex sings about Russian women ("La donna russa è femmina due volte"); Olga counters with an aria comparing Parisian gentlemen with the wine of the widow Veuve Clicquot ("Eccone un altro più somigliante ancor"). Ipanov arrives and declares his love for Fedora ("Amor ti vieta"). While Lazinski plays for the party-goers, Fedora tells Ipanov that she is returning to Russia the following day. He is desperate because he has been exiled from Russia and cannot follow her; he confesses that he killed Vladimir. Fedora asks him to return after the reception is over to tell her the whole story. When she is alone, Fedora writes a letter to the chief of the Imperial Police in Russia accusing Ipanov of Vladimir's murder. Ipanov returns and explains that he killed Vladimir because Vladimir and Ipanov's wife Wanda were lovers. Ipanov had discovered them together. Vladimir shot at Ipanov and wounded him. Ipanov returned fire, killing Vladimir. Fedora realizes that she has fallen in love with Ipanov and that he killed not for political ends, but to defend himself and his honor. They embrace and she convinces him to spend the night with her.

Act 3
The Bernese Oberland in Switzerland

Ipanov and Fedora are now lovers (his brief aria: "Te sola io guardo") and living in her villa. With them is her friend, Olga, who sings an aria about bicycling ("Se amor ti allena", sometimes omitted). De Siriex arrives. He teases Olga about her previous lover Lazinski ("Fatevi cor, Contessa!") and invites her on a bicycle ride. He tells Fedora that as a result of the letter she wrote to the police chief, Ipanov's brother Valeriano was arrested for his role in the plot to murder Vladimir and imprisoned in a fortress on the Neva river. One night the river flooded and Valeriano drowned. When Ipanov's mother heard the news, she collapsed and died. Fedora is anguished – she has caused two deaths ("Dio di giustizia"). Ipanov receives a letter from a friend in Russia informing him of his mother's and brother's deaths and that the cause was a woman living in Paris who had written a letter denouncing him to the police. Fedora confesses to writing the letter and begs Ipanov's forgiveness. When he initially refuses and curses her, Fedora swallows poison which she keeps hidden in the cross she always wears. Ipanov begs the doctor to save her but it is too late. Fedora dies in Ipanov's arms.

Recordings

Noted aria
"Amor ti vieta" ("Love forbids you") is the most famous aria from the opera and is often sung by tenors in recitals, especially as an encore piece. This short aria (approximately 1:51 minutes) is sung by Count Loris when he declares his love to Fedora in Act II. An immediate favourite with the audience, it was encored by Enrico Caruso on the opera's opening night. Caruso can be heard singing the aria, accompanied on the piano by Giordano himself, on Volume 1 of Enrico Caruso – The Complete Opera Recordings (Naxos 8.110703). This recording was made in 1902.

References
Notes

Sources
 'Amor ti vieta' documentation on The Aria Database. (accessed April 1, 2007)
 Fairman, Richard, 'Review: Fedora, Opera Holland Park, London', The Financial Times, June 11, 2006.
 Gelli, Piero (ed.), Dizionario dell'Opera, 2006, Milan: Baldini Castoldi Dalai, 
 Girardi, Michele, 'Fedora, una prima donna sull'orlo di una crisi di nervi' in Fedora, 2000, Turin: Teatro Regio di Torino, pp. 9–20.PDF file. (accessed April 1, 2007)
 Goebel, Wilfried, Fedora Discography 1931–1998, on Operone (accessed April 1, 2007)
 Melitz, Leo, The Opera Goer's Complete Guide (Translated by Richard Salinger), 1921, New York: Garden City Publishing Company. (accessed April 1, 2007)
 Metropolitan Opera Archives. (accessed April 1, 2007)
 Ponick, T.L., 'Voices save Fedora from poor staging', The Washington Times, November 1, 1998 (review of the October 1998 performance at Washington National Opera).
 Tommasini, Anthony, '70 Years Later, a Melodrama Is Back', The New York Times, October 7, 1996. (accessed April 1, 2007) 
 Volpe, Michael, 'Fedora – just what the audience ordered' (programme notes for the June 2006 performances by Holland Park Opera, London: Royal Borough of Kensington). (accessed April 1, 2007)

External links
 
 libretto of Fedora, from operalibretto.com

Operas by Umberto Giordano
Italian-language operas
Verismo operas
1898 operas
Operas
Operas based on works by Victorien Sardou
Operas based on plays